The Fernsehturm in central Berlin was constructed between 1965 and 1969 by the government of the German Democratic Republic, or East Germany, as both a functional broadcasting facility and a symbol of Communist power. 

It remains a landmark today from its position next to Alexanderplatz in the city's Marien Quarter, part of the district of Mitte, visible across most suburban districts of Berlin. With its height of 368 metres (including antenna) it is the tallest structure in Germany, and the third-tallest structure in the European Union. When built it was the fourth-tallest freestanding structure in the world after the Ostankino Tower, the Empire State Building and 875 North Michigan Avenue, then known as The John Hancock Center.

Of the four tallest structures in Europe, it is 2 m shorter than the Torreta de Guardamar, 0.5 m shorter than the Riga Radio and TV Tower, and 8 m taller than the Trbovlje Power Station in 2017. The structure is also more than 220 metres higher than the old Berlin Radio Tower in the western part of the city, which was built in the 1920s.

In addition to its main function as the location of several radio and television broadcasting stations, the building – internally known as "Fernmeldeturm 32" – serves as a viewing tower with observation deck including a bar at a height of 203 metres, as well as a rotating restaurant. Also, the Berlin TV Tower can be booked as a venue for events. The distinctive city landmark has undergone a radical, symbolic transformation: After German reunification, it changed from a politically charged, national symbol of the GDR into a citywide symbol of a reunited Berlin. Due to its universal and timeless design, it has increasingly been used as a trademark and is identified worldwide with Berlin and Germany. In 1979, the Berlin TV Tower received monument status by the GDR, a status which was perpetuated after the German reunification.

The tower has become one of the most prominent symbols of the country and is often in the establishing shot of films set in Berlin, alongside monuments such as the Brandenburg Gate, the Berlin Victory Column and the Reichstag building. It is also one of the ten most popular attractions in Germany with more than 1,000,000 visitors every year.

Overview
The Fernsehturm is the fourth tallest free-standing structure in Europe, after Moscow's Ostankino Tower, the Kyiv TV Tower and the Riga Radio and TV Tower. The sphere is a visitor platform and a revolving restaurant in the middle of the sphere. When first constructed, it turned once per hour; the speed was later doubled following the tower's 1997 renovation.

Two lifts transport visitors to the sphere of the tower within 40 seconds. There is also a stairway with 986 steps. Wheelchair users cannot visit the tower due to fire regulations.

To mark the 2006 FIFA World Cup in Germany, for which the final match was played in the Berlin Olympic Stadium, the sphere was decorated as a football with magenta-coloured pentagons, reflecting the corporate colour of World Cup sponsor and owner of the Fernsehturm, Deutsche Telekom.

Location and surroundings 

The Berlin TV Tower is located southwest of the Alexanderplatz station and northeast of the Marx-Engels Forum. The structure is often erroneously described as being part of the Alexanderplatz that lies to the northeast.

In addition to the Berlin U-Bahn and S-Bahn lines, several tram and bus lines stop at Alexanderplatz station, from which the middle exit leads to the entrance building of the TV Tower.

The Interhotel Stadt Berlin on Alexanderplatz, planned concurrently to the TV Tower and completed in 1970, is 125 metres high and is now operated as a Park Inn by Radisson Berlin Alexanderplatz. Between 1967 and 1972, the Rathauspassagen shopping arcade was built next to the Rotes Rathaus, directly south of the TV Tower.

History

Background 
At the European Broadcasting Conference in Stockholm in 1952, which was responsible for the coordination of frequency waves in Europe, the GDR – not recognised politically by most countries at the time – was only allocated two frequency channels. Under these circumstances, it was impossible to cover Berlin's urban area by multiple small broadcasting stations without interference and thus disturbances or gaps in the broadcasting signals. For comprehensive and continuous coverage, a powerful large broadcasting facility at the highest possible location was required. In the 1950s, this task was fulfilled in Berlin by the fragile makeshift stations of Deutscher Fernsehfunk (East German broadcasting organisation).

As early as 1952, GDR's Deutsche Post began planning a TV tower for Berlin. The plans initially involved a location in the southeast of Berlin. However, the project was interrupted after construction had started, when it transpired that the site was only eight kilometres away from the Berlin Schönefeld Airport (now part of Berlin Brandenburg Airport) and the tower threatened to jeopardise flight operations due to its height and location at the edge of an airport corridor. After various compromise solutions failed, the construction project was discontinued in 1956. In the following years, alternatives were sought and several sites were discussed, including in Berlin Friedrichshain, but these plans also fell victim to austerity measures triggered by the high costs of building the Berlin Wall.

In the next few years, the search for a new location was continued. Alongside its actual purpose of providing the best possible broadcasting services, the role of the tower as a new landmark of Berlin was increasingly gaining significance. For this reason, in 1964 the government demanded that the tower be built at a central location, an appeal that was supported by the SED leadership. Ultimately, the choice of location was a political decision. Walter Ulbricht, leader of the Socialist Unity Party which governed East Germany, decided to allow the construction of a television tower modelled on the Fernsehturm Stuttgart and the first artificial Earth satellite, Sputnik.

Various architects were involved in the planning and implementation of the tower between 1965–69, including Hermann Henselmann and Jörg Streitparth, Fritz Dieter, Günter Franke and Werner Ahrendt, as well as Walter Herzog, Gerhard Kosel and Herbert Aust. The construction of the Tower and the surrounding Pavilion building at its base resulted in the razing and clearing of a huge section of the historic centre of the capital of Germany. A medieval church stands next to the tower as a testament to the destruction of the old city.

Construction of the Tower 
Work on the foundation began on 4 August 1965 and was finished by the end of 1965. The concreting of the tower foot began on 15 March 1966. The concreting progressed rapidly, so that the 100-metre mark was exceeded on 4 October 1966. The shaft reached its final height on 16 June 1967. A total of 8,000 cubic metres of concrete was used to build the shaft, which was 248.78 metres high and weighed 26,000 tons.

While the shaft was being erected, the preliminary work for the tower ball progressed. The working group VEB Ipro had worked out the procedure for assembling the ball on the reinforced concrete shaft, according to which the ball could be pieced together from 120 separate segments on the ground. In April 1967, a 35-metre-high replica of the shaft was erected on the construction site between Marienkirche and the Red Town Hall on which the ball segments were pre-assembled. This work lasted until November 1967. The construction costs had meanwhile skyrocketed from an estimated 33 million to 95 million marks, caused mainly by components and materials that had to be paid in foreign currencies, some of which were imported from West Germany. In February 1968, the assembly of the ball on the shaft was started. The last segment of the ball was finally installed on October 7. A spike was mounted on the tower structure and the antenna structure above the ball, so that work on the interior could be started the following year.

At the beginning of 1969, water trickled into the interior of the tower, causing considerable damage; the ball had to be sealed again. Until 3 October 1969, the interior was expanded, and the entrance pavilion was completed. After 53 months of actual construction work, the tower was completed in "record-breaking" time in spite of all the adversities. The costs amounted to over 132 million marks.

The building, officially called the Fernseh- und UKW-Turm Berlin (Television and VHF Tower Berlin), was the world's second highest television tower in October 1969. The only TV tower that was taller was the Ostankino in Moscow. It was also the third-highest freestanding building of its time, after the tower in Moscow and the Empire State Building in New York.

Since the inauguration 
On 3 October 1969 Walter Ulbricht, together with his wife Lotte and a delegation of high-ranking companions, including Günter Mittag, Herbert Warnke, Paul Verner, Rudolph Schulze, Erich Honecker, Werner Lamberz and Erich Mielke, inaugurated the television tower and gave the starting signal for GDR's second state channel, DFF 2, thus launching colour TV on two channels in the GDR. The tower has been accessible to the public since 7 October 1969, Republic Day.

From 16 February 1970, five FM programmes were broadcast from the tower; a first television programme followed on 4 April 1970. At the beginning of 1972, the two planned pavilions for exhibitions, the Berlin Information Centre, a cinema and gastronomic facilities were completed. Overall, the restaurants offered space for around 1000 guests.  After the establishment of a legal basis for the preservation of monuments in 1975, the Berlin TV Tower was awarded this status in 1979. After the fall of the GDR, the Federal Republic of Germany enshrined the building's monument status.

After German reunification in 1990, voices were raised favouring the demolition of the tower.  The Federal Republic of Germany decided to keep the building. As the new operator, Deutsche Telekom finally invested more than 50 million marks to overhaul the broadcasting facilities, and a number of renovations were also undertaken on the building. Among other things, the antenna received a new, more powerful tip from the height of 327 metres, increasing the tower's height from originally 365 metres to 368 metres in summer 1997.

The TV Tower is one of the buildings in Berlin that is illuminated by a special light installation for several days during the Festival of Lights held every year in October since 2004. On the occasion of the 2006 FIFA World Cup, the tower ball was covered to make it look like a magenta football as part of an advertising campaign by the operator Telekom.

"Pope's Revenge"
When the sun shines on the Fernsehturm's tiled stainless-steel dome, the reflection usually appears in the form of a Greek cross. Berliners nicknamed the luminous cross Rache des Papstes, or the "Pope's Revenge", believing the Christian symbol a divine retaliation for the government’s removal of crosses from East Berlin’s churches. For the same reasons, the structure was also called "St. Walter" (from Walter Ulbricht).  U.S. President Ronald Reagan mentioned this in his Tear down this wall speech on 12 June 1987.

Gallery

Visitors and tourism 

The Berlin TV Tower is not only a broadcasting tower, but also a landmark, tourist attraction and venue. The TV Tower's observation deck and revolving restaurant are run by Magnicity, a group based in France that operates attractions at the top of the Montparnasse Tower in Paris and 360 CHICAGO at the former John Hancock Center in Chicago, among others. The Berlin TV Tower is the highest publicly accessible building in Europe and was the highest publicly accessible observation platform in Germany until 2017, when the TK Elevator Test Tower in Rottweil has overtaken this rank. In the first three years after its inauguration, as many as four million people visited the structure. After the German reunification, the visitor average has levelled off to approximately 1.2 million from some 90 countries a year. Of these, around 60 per cent come from abroad, with Spaniards being the biggest group, accounting for 8.1 per cent, followed by Italians (7.6 per cent) and Danes (6.7 per cent). The maximum admissible number of persons inside the ball is 320 persons. Of the up to 5,000 visitors daily, about 1,500 visit the tower restaurant. In GDR times, the duration of a stay in the Tele-Café was limited to 60 minutes and in the observation deck to 30 minutes.

The two visitor elevators carry 12 people each in about 40 seconds to the observation platform at 203 metres, where Berlin's highest bar is also located. From 60 windows there is a panoramic view over the whole of Berlin and the surrounding areas. The restaurant, which is located 21 steps above the observation platform at 207 metres altitude, rotates 360 degrees in an hour. For fire protection reasons, the main kitchen is located at the foot of the tower. The meals are transported by lift to the restaurant floor, where they are prepared in a small satellite kitchen. Apart from the two evacuation platforms below the tower basket, the fire protection concept includes a strict smoking ban throughout the entire structure. Wheelchair users and persons with current walking disabilities cannot visit the Berlin TV Tower, as they would not be able to use the escape route in case of emergency. Animals, prams and large luggage are also not admitted for safety reasons.

On 14 June 2011 – almost 42 years after the inauguration – the then Governing Mayor Klaus Wowereit welcomed the 50 millionth visitor. The entire city can be viewed from the observation deck of the TV Tower. If there is good visibility, the view reaches as far as the recreational park Tropical Islands Resort, at a distance of almost 60 kilometres.

The TV Tower, which is open all year to the public, has seasonal opening times. The last ascent to the observation platform is daily at 11.30 pm, whereas the last admission to the restaurant is at 11 pm. The public area can be rented for special events, parties, receptions and other events with a maximum of 200 guests. Civil weddings can also be celebrated on the TV Tower. In this case, the bar area on the observation deck is reserved for an hour for the bridal couple and a wedding party of up to 30 guests.

Technical details 
1 tuned mass damper
2 Kone lifts for transport of visitors
1 lift for transport of technical equipment and staff of technical facilities
Steel stairway with 986 steps
Observation deck at 
Restaurant at 
Height of the tower: 
Weight of the shaft: 
Weight of the sphere 
Diameter of the sphere 
Outer diameter of the foundation: 
Diameter of the tower ball: 
150 different antennas for TV and radio transmission on the antenna carrier
20,000 square kilometres of transmission area

Channels by frequency

Analogue FM radio

Digital radio (DAB)/Digital mobile television (DMB)

Digital television (DVB-T)
UHF 25 (506 MHz) – RTL Group
RTL
RTL II
Super RTL
VOX
UHF 27 (522 MHz) – ARD national programming
Das Erste
rbb Fernsehen Berlin
Phoenix
tagesschau24/rbb Fernsehen (Brandenburg)
UHF 33 (570 MHz) – ZDFvision
ZDF
3sat
ZDFinfokanal
ZDFneo/KiKa
UHF 39 (618 MHz) – Mixed Berlin 4
QVC
Disney Channel Germany
Bibel TV
Bayerisches Fernsehen
n-tv
RTL Shop/Euronews
5 radio stations
UHF 44 (658 MHz) – ProSiebenSat.1
ProSieben
Sat.1
kabel eins
N24
UHF 47 (682 MHz) – ARD regional programming
MDR Fernsehen (Sachsen/Sachsen-Anhalt/Thüringen)
arte
NDR Fernsehen (Bremen/Hamburg/Mecklenburg-Vorpommern/Niedersachsen/Schleswig-Holstein)
hr-fernsehen
UHF 50 (706 MHz) – Mixed Berlin 1
WDR Fernsehen (Köln)
SWR Fernsehen (Baden-Württemberg/Rheinland-Pfalz)
HSE24
Tele 5
UHF 56 (754 MHz) – Mixed Berlin 2
iMusic1
sixx
Eurosport
TV.Berlin
UHF 59 (778 MHz) – Mixed Berlin 3
Servus TV
Anixe
Juwelo TV

Analogue TV stations
The analogue TV service was shut down on 4 August 2003.

See also

List of towers
List of tallest freestanding structures in the world
Fernsehturm Stuttgart
Funkturm Berlin
Fernmeldeturm Berlin

References

 Tower history

External links

 
Fernsehturm Official Website
Berliner Fernsehturm during Football Worldcup 06
All about the tower and Panorama

Towers completed in 1969
Observation towers in Berlin
Buildings and structures in Mitte
Tourist attractions in Berlin
Communication towers in Germany
Landmarks in Germany
Towers with revolving restaurants
Perceptions of religious imagery in natural phenomena
1969 establishments in East Germany
Radio masts and towers in Europe
Observation towers
East German architecture